Mano rubata (stolen hand) is a 1989 Italian television movie directed by Alberto Lattuada. The film concerns gambling and is the last work of Lattuada.

Plot 

The story takes place in Paris. Günther Mayer, a young writer, is impressed by a beautiful woman whom he sees for the first time through the window of a flower shop. After that he meets her briefly for a few times.

The opportunity to meet the beautiful stranger occurs at a party in the house of Marianne, a friend of his. Among the guests there is a writer, a professor of psychology, an aristocrat, a starlet, a painter, and a hypochondriac woman.

The stranger, Juliette Carfienne, arrives at Marianne's house while Günther, bored, is leaving. After they meet she refuses Günther's offers of friendship. He offers the guests a game: poker elimination that will finally have one winner only and who will be the only one who will stay dressed; losers must undress themselves or commit suicide. In the last hand between Juliette and Günther, the latter wins. All losers undress except Juliette who chooses to commit   suicide. As a sign of defiance, Günther takes an automatic pistol from his jacket and hands it to Juliet. While the latter is about to shoot, Günther removes the weapon from her hand and wants to be who lost the game; then he undresses. Juliette declares herself defeated and also strips.

After the party, the guests leave; on the stairs Günther tells Juliet that he has only seen her eyes; both leave together.

Cast 

 Carmen Loderus, as Juliette Carfienne
 Ralph Schicha, as Günther Mayer 
 Milena Vukotic, as Fabienne
 Geneviève Omini, as Marianne
 Clément Harari, as a professor of psychology
 Christiane Jean, as a female hypochondriac
 Christian de Tillière, as an aristocrat
 Roger Miremont, as a painter
 Patrick Bonnel, as a writer
 Herma Vos, as a starlette
 Marie Florestan

References

External links

1989 television films
1989 films
Italian television films
1989 drama films
Films set in Italy
Films directed by Alberto Lattuada
Films scored by Armando Trovajoli
1980s Italian-language films